Vancouver East was a provincial electoral district for the Legislative Assembly of British Columbia, Canada.  It first appeared on the hustings in the general election of 1933.  It and the other new Vancouver ridings in this year, Vancouver-Burrard, Vancouver-Point Grey and Vancouver Centre, were all created from the old Vancouver City riding, which was a six-member seat.  Vancouver East was a two-member seat.

For a full listing of Vancouver ridings, historical and current, please see Vancouver (electoral districts).

Demographics

Electoral history 1933-1986 

Note: Winners of each election are in bold.

|Liberal
|Margaret Russell Barclay
|align="right"|5,063
|align="right"|12.37%

|Conservative
|William Corran
|align="right"|3,079
|align="right"|7.52%

|Liberal
|Charles Albert Donovan
|align="right"|5,251
|align="right"|12.83%

|Conservative
|Thomas Irvine
|align="right"|2,835
|align="right"|6.93%

|Co-operative Commonwealth Fed.
|James Lyle Telford
|align="right"|11,752
|align="right"|28.72%

|Co-operative Commonwealth Fed.
|Harold Edward Winch
|align="right"|11,350
|align="right"|27.74%
|- bgcolor="white"
!align="right" colspan=3|Total valid votes
!align="right"|40,918
!align="right"|100.00%
!align="right"|
|- bgcolor="white"
!align="right" colspan=3|Total rejected ballots
!align="right"|362

|-

|Co-operative Commonwealth
|Arthur James Turner
|align="right"|19,284
|align="right"|25.35%
|align="right"|
|align="right"|unknown

|Co-operative Commonwealth
|Harold Edward Winch
|align="right"|20,531
|align="right"|27.00%
|align="right"|
|align="right"|unknown
|- bgcolor="white"
!align="right" colspan=3|Total valid votes
!align="right"|76,059
!align="right"|100.00%
!align="right"|
|- bgcolor="white"
!align="right" colspan=3|Total rejected ballots
!align="right"|523
!align="right"|
!align="right"|
|- bgcolor="white"
!align="right" colspan=3|Turnout
!align="right"|%
!align="right"|
!align="right"|
|}

For the elimination-ballot elections of 1952 and 1953 the riding's voters were presented with two ballots, one for each seat, with two separate candidate-races:

|Liberal
|Everett Crowley
|align="right"|6,574
|align="right"|14.85%
|align="right"|8,263
|align="right"|19.37%
|align="right"|
|align="right"|unknown

|Progressive Conservative
|Emma Loring Tinsman
|align="right"|2,850
|align="right"|6.44%
|align="right"| -
|align="right"| -.- %
|align="right"|
|align="right"|unknown

|Co-operative Commonwealth Fed.
|Arthur James Turner
|align="right"|21,006
|align="right"|47.45%
|align="right"|21,960
|align="right"|51.48%
|align="right"|
|align="right"|unknown
|- bgcolor="white"
!align="right" colspan=3|Total valid votes
!align="right"|44,270
!align="right"|100.00%
!align="right"|42,656
!align="right"|%
!align="right"|
|- bgcolor="white"
!align="right" colspan=3|Total rejected ballots
!align="right"|2,701
!align="right"|
!align="right"|
|- bgcolor="white"
!align="right" colspan=3|Turnout
!align="right"|%
!align="right"|
!align="right"|
|- bgcolor="white"
!align="right" colspan=9|3 Preferential ballot; first and final of four (4) counts only shown.
|}

|Progressive Conservative
|Irving Simpson Finkleman
|align="right"|3,045
|align="right"|6.79%
|align="right"|3,045
|align="right"|6.79%
|align="right"|
|align="right"|unknown

|Liberal
|Frank George Perrin Lewis
|align="right"|5,286
|align="right"|11.79%
|align="right"|5,286
|align="right"|11.79%
|align="right"|
|align="right"|unknown

|Co-operative Commonwealth Fed.
|Harold Edward Winch
|align="right"|23,051
|align="right"|51.42%
|align="right"|23,051
|align="right"|51.42%
|align="right"|
|align="right"|unknown
|- bgcolor="white"
!align="right" colspan=3|Total valid votes
!align="right"|44,833
!align="right"|100.00%
!align="right"|44,833
!align="right"|%
!align="right"|
|- bgcolor="white"
!align="right" colspan=3|Total rejected ballots
!align="right"|2,338
!align="right"|
!align="right"|
|- bgcolor="white"
!align="right" colspan=3|Turnout
!align="right"|%
!align="right"|
!align="right"|
|- bgcolor="white"
!align="right" colspan=9|4 Preferential ballot; one count only required on this ballot.
|}

|Liberal
|Everett Crowley
|align="right"|5,272
|align="right"|13.08%
|align="right"|5,796
|align="right"|14.63%
|align="right"|
|align="right"|unknown

|Progressive Conservative
|Irving Simpson Finkleman
|align="right"|747
|align="right"|1.86%
|align="right"| -
|align="right"| -.- %
|align="right"|
|align="right"|unknown

|Co-operative Commonwealth Fed.
|Arthur James Turner
|align="right"|19,475
|align="right"|48.32%
|align="right"|19,942
|align="right"|50.35%
|align="right"|
|align="right"|unknown
|- bgcolor="white"
!align="right" colspan=3|Total valid votes
!align="right"|40,304
!align="right"|100.00%
!align="right"|39,610
!align="right"|%
!align="right"|
|- bgcolor="white"
!align="right" colspan=3|Total rejected ballots
!align="right"|2,592
!align="right"|
!align="right"|
!align="right"|
!align="right"|
|- bgcolor="white"
!align="right" colspan=3|Total Registered Voters
!align="right"|
!align="right"|
!align="right"|
!align="right"|
!align="right"|
|- bgcolor="white"
!align="right" colspan=3|Turnout
!align="right"|%
!align="right"|
!align="right"|
!align="right"|
!align="right"|
|- bgcolor="white"
!align="right" colspan=9|5 Preferential ballot; first and final of four (4) counts only shown.
|}

|Liberal
|Phillip James Lipp
|align="right"|4,727
|align="right"|11.76%
|align="right"|4,727
|align="right"|11.76%
|align="right"|
|align="right"|unknown

|Progressive Conservative
|Stanley Alexander Roberts
|align="right"|803
|align="right"|2.00%
|align="right"|803
|align="right"|2.00%
|align="right"|
|align="right"|unknown

|Co-operative Commonwealth Fed.
|Arnold Alexander Webster
|align="right"|20,583
|align="right"|51.22%
|align="right"|20,583
|align="right"|51.22%
|align="right"|
|align="right"|unknown

|- bgcolor="white"
!align="right" colspan=3|Total valid votes
!align="right"|40,190
!align="right"|100.00%
!align="right"|40,190
!align="right"|%
!align="right"|
|- bgcolor="white"
!align="right" colspan=3|Total rejected ballots
!align="right"|2,681
!align="right"|
!align="right"|
!align="right"|
!align="right"|
|- bgcolor="white"
!align="right" colspan=3|Total Registered Voters
!align="right"|
!align="right"|
!align="right"|
!align="right"|
!align="right"|
|- bgcolor="white"
!align="right" colspan=3|Turnout
!align="right"|%
!align="right"|
!align="right"|
!align="right"|
!align="right"|
|- bgcolor="white"
!align="right" colspan=9|6 Preferential ballot; only one count required on this ballot.
|}

|-

|Progressive Conservative
|Lorne C. Aggett
|align="right"|720
|align="right"|0.85%
|align="right"|
|align="right"|unknown

|Progressive Conservative
|Sidney Lewis Beyer
|align="right"|541
|align="right"|0.64%
|align="right"|
|align="right"|unknown

|Liberal
|John Leslie McCabe
|align="right"|4,156
|align="right"|4.92%
|align="right"|
|align="right"|unknown

|Liberal
|Patrick Joseph O'Donohue
|align="right"|4,229
|align="right"|5.01%
|align="right"|
|align="right"|unknown

|Co-operative Commonwealth Fed.
|Harold Edward Thayer
|align="right"|18,541
|align="right"|21.96%
|align="right"|
|align="right"|unknown

|Co-operative Commonwealth Fed.
|Arthur James Turner
|align="right"|19,774
|align="right"|23.42%
|align="right"|
|align="right"|unknown
|- bgcolor="white"
!align="right" colspan=3|Total valid votes
!align="right"| 84,422
!align="right"|100.00%
!align="right"|
|- bgcolor="white"
!align="right" colspan=3|Total rejected ballots
!align="right"|76
!align="right"|
!align="right"|
|- bgcolor="white"
!align="right" colspan=3|Turnout
!align="right"|%
!align="right"|
!align="right"|
|}

|-

|Liberal
|Harold (Harry) Appleton
|align="right"|5,906
|align="right"|5.92%
|align="right"|
|align="right"|unknown

|Liberal
|Joseph Charles Bryant
|align="right"|5,828
|align="right"|5.86%
|align="right"|
|align="right"|unknown

|Progressive Conservative
|Madeline Barbara Dent
|align="right"|999
|align="right"|1.01%
|align="right"|
|align="right"|unknown

|Progressive Conservative
|Norman Gareth Dent
|align="right"|1,080
|align="right"|1.09%
|align="right"|
|align="right"|unknown

|Co-operative Commonwealth Fed.
|Alexander Barrett MacDonald
|align="right"|25,610
|align="right"|25.74%
|align="right"|
|align="right"|unknown

|Co-operative Commonwealth Fed.
|Arthur James Turner
|align="right"|25,580
|align="right"|25.71%
|align="right"|
|align="right"|unknown
|- bgcolor="white"
!align="right" colspan=3|Total valid votes
!align="right"|99,479
!align="right"|100.00%
!align="right"|
|- bgcolor="white"
!align="right" colspan=3|Total rejected ballots
!align="right"|761
!align="right"|
!align="right"|
|- bgcolor="white"
!align="right" colspan=3|Turnout
!align="right"|%
!align="right"|
!align="right"|
|}

|-

|Progressive Conservative
|Gladys Chong
|align="right"|2,308
|align="right"|2.64%
|align="right"|
|align="right"|unknown

|Progressive Conservative
|William Dronsfield
|align="right"|2,260
|align="right"|2.59%
|align="right"|
|align="right"|unknown

|Independent
|Albert Dunn
|align="right"|215
|align="right"|0.25%
|align="right"|
|align="right"|unknown

|Liberal
|John Joseph Fedyk
|align="right"|3,996
|align="right"|4.58%
|align="right"|
|align="right"|unknown

|Liberal
|Lloyd Bruce Little
|align="right"|3,901
|align="right"|4.47%
|align="right"|
|align="right"|unknown
|align="right"|unknown

|- bgcolor="white"
!align="right" colspan=3|Total valid votes
!align="right"|87,294
!align="right"|100.00%
!align="right"|
|- bgcolor="white"
!align="right" colspan=3|Total rejected ballots
!align="right"|644
!align="right"|
!align="right"|
|- bgcolor="white"
!align="right" colspan=3|Turnout
!align="right"|%
!align="right"|
!align="right"|
|}

|-

|Liberal
|John Joseph Fedyk
|align="right"|1,637
|align="right"|3.60%
|align="right"|
|align="right"|unknown

|Liberal
|Harry Pedrini
|align="right"|1,583
|align="right"|3.48%
|align="right"|
|align="right"|unknown

|- bgcolor="white"
!align="right" colspan=3|Total valid votes
!align="right"|45,521
!align="right"|100.00%
!align="right"|
|- bgcolor="white"
!align="right" colspan=3|Total rejected ballots
!align="right"|404
!align="right"|
!align="right"|
|- bgcolor="white"
!align="right" colspan=3|Turnout
!align="right"|%
!align="right"|
!align="right"|
|}

|-

|Liberal
|Mary Gertrude Gibson
|align="right"|2,398
|align="right"|4.72%
|align="right"|
|align="right"|unknown

|Independent
|Lionel Vincent Hodgson
|align="right"|54
|align="right"|0.11%
|align="right"|
|align="right"|unknown

|Liberal
|James Morrison
|align="right"|2,320
|align="right"|4.57%
|align="right"|
|align="right"|unknown

|- bgcolor="white"
!align="right" colspan=3|Total valid votes
!align="right"|50,810
!align="right"|100.00%
!align="right"|
|- bgcolor="white"
!align="right" colspan=3|Total rejected ballots
!align="right"|338
!align="right"|
!align="right"|
|- bgcolor="white"
!align="right" colspan=3|Turnout
!align="right"|%
!align="right"|
!align="right"|
|}

|-

|Progressive Conservative
|Donald McIntyre
|align="right"|2,453
|align="right"|4.59%
|align="right"|
|align="right"|unknown

|Progressive Conservative
|Paul John Mitchell
|align="right"|2,299
|align="right"|4.30%
|align="right"|
|align="right"|unknown

|- bgcolor="white"
!align="right" colspan=3|Total valid votes
!align="right"|53,422
!align="right"|100.00%
!align="right"|
|- bgcolor="white"
!align="right" colspan=3|Total rejected ballots
!align="right"|515
!align="right"|
!align="right"|
|- bgcolor="white"
!align="right" colspan=3|Turnout
!align="right"|%
!align="right"|
!align="right"|
|}

|-

|Liberal
|Norman Sidney Chamberlist
|align="right"|1,591
|align="right"|2.87%

|North American Labour Party
|Calvin Alphonso Segur
|align="right"|42
|align="right"|0.07%

|Liberal
|Florence Anne Simatos
|align="right"|1,387
|align="right"|2.50%

|- bgcolor="white"
!align="right" colspan=3|Total valid votes
!align="right"|55,462
|- bgcolor="white"
!align="right" colspan=3|Total rejected ballots
!align="right"|582
|}

|-

|North American Labour Party
|Andre Doucet
|align="right"|152
|align="right"|0.23%
|align="right"|
|align="right"|unknown

|Progressive Conservative
|William Arthur Honour
|align="right"|1,068
|align="right"|1.61%
|align="right"|
|align="right"|unknown

|Progressive Conservative
|Shirley Joann Keinanen
|align="right"|999
|align="right"|1.51%
|align="right"|
|align="right"|unknown

|- bgcolor="white"
!align="right" colspan=3|Total valid votes
!align="right"|66,270
!align="right"|100.00%
!align="right"|
|- bgcolor="white"
!align="right" colspan=3|Total rejected ballots
!align="right"|1,032
!align="right"|
!align="right"|
|- bgcolor="white"
!align="right" colspan=3|Turnout
!align="right"|%
!align="right"|
!align="right"|
|}

|-

|align="right"|unknown

|- bgcolor="white"
!align="right" colspan=3|Total valid votes
!align="right"| 69,586
!align="right"|100.00%
!align="right"|
|- bgcolor="white"
!align="right" colspan=3|Total rejected ballots
!align="right"|1,046
!align="right"|
!align="right"|
|- bgcolor="white"
!align="right" colspan=3|Turnout
!align="right"|%
!align="right"|
!align="right"|
|}

|-

|Liberal
|Val J. Anderson
|align="right"|3,348
|align="right"|4.71%
|align="right"|
|align="right"|unknown

|Liberal
|Anita M. Morris
|align="right"|2,804
|align="right"|3.95%
|align="right"|
|align="right"|unknown

|- bgcolor="white"
!align="right" colspan=3|Total valid votes
!align="right"|71,052
!align="right"|100.00%
!align="right"|
|- bgcolor="white"
!align="right" colspan=3|Total rejected ballots
!align="right"|1,718
!align="right"|
!align="right"|
|- bgcolor="white"
!align="right" colspan=3|Turnout
!align="right"|%
!align="right"|
!align="right"|
|}

A redistribution before the 1991 election dramatically changed Vancouver's long-standing electoral map by the abandonment of the century-old tradition of multiple member districts.  Vancouver East was abolished.  Its principal successor ridings were Vancouver-Kensington, Vancouver-Hastings and Vancouver-Kingsway.  Portions of Vancouver-Mount Pleasant and Vancouver-Burrard, formerly part of Vancouver Centre may also have been added.

References

External links 
Elections BC Historical Returns

Former provincial electoral districts of British Columbia